Carex tiogana is a rare species of sedge known by the common name Tioga sedge.

It is endemic to California, where it is known only from the Sierra Nevada in Mono County. There are four small occurrences.

Description
The narrow, rough-edged leaves are sickle-shaped.

This sedge is very similar to Carex capillaris and some authors argue it should be treated as a subtaxon of that species.

References

External links
 Jepson Manual Treatment — Carex tiogana
Carex tiogana — CalPhotos Photo Gallery

tiogana
Endemic flora of California
Flora of the Sierra Nevada (United States)
Plants described in 1999
Critically endangered flora of California
Natural history of Mono County, California